Wurfbainia is an Asian genus of plants in the family Zingiberaceae.  Species have been recorded from the Himalayas, S. China, Indo-China and W. & Central Malesia.  It has previously been placed as a synonym of Amomum.

Species 
Plants of the World Online currently includes:
 Wurfbainia aromatica (Roxb.) Skornick. & A.D.Poulsen
 Wurfbainia bicorniculata (K.Schum.) Skornick. & A.D.Poulsen
 Wurfbainia biflora (Jack) Skornick. & A.D.Poulsen
 Wurfbainia blumeana (Valeton) Skornick. & A.D.Poulsen
 Wurfbainia compacta (Sol. ex Maton) Skornick. & A.D.Poulsen
 Wurfbainia elegans (Ridl.) Skornick. & A.D.Poulsen
 Wurfbainia glabrifolia (Lamxay & M.F.Newman) Skornick. & A.D.Poulsen
 Wurfbainia gracilis (Blume) Skornick. & A.D.Poulsen
 Wurfbainia graminea (Wall. ex Baker) Skornick. & A.D.Poulsen
 Wurfbainia hedyosma (I.M.Turner) Skornick. & A.D.Poulsen
 Wurfbainia jainii (S.Tripathi & V.Prakash) Skornick. & A.D.Poulsen
 Wurfbainia longiligularis (T.L.Wu) Skornick. & A.D.Poulsen
 Wurfbainia micrantha (Ridl.) Skornick. & A.D.Poulsen
 Wurfbainia microcarpa (C.F.Liang & D.Fang) Skornick. & A.D.Poulsen
 Wurfbainia mindanaensis (Elmer) Skornick. & A.D.Poulsen
 Wurfbainia mollis (Ridl.) Skornick. & A.D.Poulsen
 Wurfbainia neoaurantiaca (T.L.Wu, K.Larsen & Turland) Skornick. & A.D.Poulsen
 Wurfbainia palawanensis (Elmer) Skornick. & A.D.Poulsen
 Wurfbainia quadratolaminaris (S.Q.Tong) Skornick. & A.D.Poulsen
 Wurfbainia schmidtii (K.Schum.) Skornick. & A.D.Poulsen
 Wurfbainia staminidiva (Gobilik, A.L.Lamb & A.D.Poulsen) Skornick. & A.D.Poulsen
 Wurfbainia tenella (Lamxay & M.F.Newman) Skornick. & A.D.Poulsen
 Wurfbainia testacea (Ridl.) Skornick. & A.D.Poulsen
 Wurfbainia uliginosa (J.Koenig) Giseke - type species
 Wurfbainia vera (Blackw.) Skornick. & A.D.Poulsen
 Wurfbainia villosa (Lour.) Skornick. & A.D.Poulsen

References

External links
 

 Flora of Indo-China 
 
 Zingiberales genera